TIMELESS-interacting protein is a protein that in humans is encoded by the TIPIN gene.

Interactions 

TIPIN has been shown to interact with Replication protein A1.

References

Further reading